Elections to Ards Borough Council were held on 15 May 1985 on the same day as the other Northern Irish local government elections. The election used three district electoral areas to elect a total of 20 councillors.

Election results

Note: "Votes" are the first preference votes.

Districts summary

|- class="unsortable" align="centre"
!rowspan=2 align="left"|Ward
! % 
!Cllrs
! % 
!Cllrs
! % 
!Cllrs
! % 
!Cllrs
! %
!Cllrs
! %
!Cllrs
!rowspan=2|TotalCllrs
|- class="unsortable" align="center"
!colspan=2 bgcolor="" | DUP
!colspan=2 bgcolor="" | UUP
!colspan=2 bgcolor="" | Alliance
!colspan=2 bgcolor="" | NILP
!colspan=2 bgcolor="" | UPUP
!colspan=2 bgcolor="white"| Others
|-
|align="left"|Ards Peninsula
|bgcolor="#D46A4C"|31.3
|bgcolor="#D46A4C"|2
|27.7
|2
|10.1
|1
|0.0
|0
|13.7
|1
|17.2
|1
|7
|-
|align="left"|Ards West
|bgcolor="#D46A4C"|42.9
|bgcolor="#D46A4C"|3
|39.3
|2
|17.1
|1
|0.0
|0
|0.0
|0
|0.7
|0
|6
|-
|align="left"|Newtownards
|bgcolor="#D46A4C"|44.3
|bgcolor="#D46A4C"|3
|25.7
|2
|10.6
|1
|16.3
|1
|0.0
|0
|3.1
|0
|7
|-
|- class="unsortable" class="sortbottom" style="background:#C9C9C9"
|align="left"| Total
|39.3
|8
|30.5
|6
|12.4
|3
|5.6
|1
|4.9
|1
|7.3
|1
|20
|-
|}

District results

Ards Peninsula

1985: 2 x DUP, 2 x UUP, 1 x UPUP, 1 x Alliance, 1 x Independent

Ards West

1985: 3 x DUP, 2 x UUP, 1 x Alliance

Newtownards

1985: 3 x DUP, 2 x UUP, 1 x NILP, 1 x Alliance

References

Ards Borough Council elections
Ards